Joseph Vitus Burg (27 August 1768, in Offenburg – 22 May 1833, in Mainz) was a German Roman Catholic clergyman. From 1830 until his death he served as the second post-Napoleonic Bishop of Mainz.

References

External links
https://www.deutsche-biographie.de/gnd117164208.html#ndbcontent

1768 births
1833 deaths
Bishops of Mainz (1802-present)
People from Offenburg